The Meistriliiga Player of the Year is an annual award given to the best Meistriliiga player for his performances in the league.

Winners

Fans' Player of the Year
In addition to the Meistriliiga Player of the Year, the Meistriliiga Fans' Player of the Year is voted by the readers of Soccernet.ee.

References

External links
 

Meistriliiga
 
Estonia 2
Lists of Estonian sportspeople
Estonian sports trophies and awards
Association football player non-biographical articles